Welcome to Night Vale is a podcast written by Joseph Fink and Jeffrey Cranor. The series narrates the daily events of Night Vale, a fictitious town in the Southwestern United States, in the format of a fortnightly radio show. The series has been running since June 2012, with an episode typically being released on the first and fifteenth day of each month. Alongside these, there have also been several live episodes that were performed during extensive tours across Europe and North America. Audio recordings of these live events have also been released. Additionally, several bonus episodes with guest writers were released during a short hiatus in November 2014.

Series overview

Episodes

Main series

Year One

Year Two

Year Three

Year Four

Year Five

Year Six

Year Seven

Year Eight

Year Nine

Year Ten

Year Eleven

Live episodes
Welcome to Night Vale has toured around the world performing extended-length original episode scripts. Recordings of selected performances have been released to digital download after the conclusion of the tour. "Old Oak Doors" and "Faceless Old Woman (Live)" (episodes 49 and 146 respectively) were both live shows that were released as part of the main podcast.

Virtual live shows
Due to the COVID-19 pandemic causing all touring operations to cease, the Night Vale crew started to put on livestreamed performances of past live shows, with new material and new guest voices.

Bonus episodes
The podcast took a hiatus from regular podcast episodes during November 2014. However, they produced two bonus episodes, composed of stories submitted for a book project that ultimately was not published. Further bonus episodes, excerpts from live shows, were subsequently released.

Donor Bonus Episodes
In 2016 Night Vale Presents started to publish exclusive episodes for "Weird Scout" level donors.

Remix episodes
Beginning in 2016, the podcast planned a hiatus during the month of January every year. During this time, remixes of old episodes are released in lieu of regular episodes.

References

Welcome to Night Vale